The extra-virgin olive oil Terra d'Otranto is produced with the olive cultivars Cellina di Nardò and Ogliarola for, at least, 60%. They are mixed with other minor varieties of the local olive groves. Its name is linked with the historical region of Terra d'Otranto which included almost all the municipalities of the current provinces of Taranto, Brindisi and Lecce. It is recognised as PDO product.

Origins 
The cultivation of the olive tree in Terra d'Otranto has been introduced by the Greeks and by Phoenicians. Nevertheless, after the cessation of this activity during the Middle Ages, the Basilian monks started the first booming market of olive oil of this territory.

Geography 
The extra-virgin olive oil Terra d'Otranto is produced in the area between the Ionian and the Adriatic Sea, between the Murge in the province of Taranto and the Serre next to Lecce. This territory includes all the cities and villages of the province of Lecce, in the eastern part of the province of Taranto and in the municipalities of Brindisi, Cellino San Marco, Erchie, Francavilla Fontana, Latiano, Mesagne, Oria, San Donaci, San Pancrazio Salentino, San Pietro Vernotico, Torchiarolo and Torre Santa Susanna in the northern part of Salento. The limit of the altitudinal range is 517 m. above sea level. The soil is mainly made of limestone.

Characteristics 
The extra-virgin olive oil Terra d'Otranto is light yellow with green shades. It has a fruity taste with some light bitter and spicy aroma. It is perfect for pasta, vegetables and legumes, but it can be used also with secondo courses.

Consortium 
Consorzio tutela olio DOP Terra d'Otranto, Lecce

See also 
 Terra d'Otranto
 Olive oil
 Salento
 Apulia
 Terre Tarentine

References 

Olive oil
Cuisine of Apulia
Agriculture in Italy
Italian products with protected designation of origin